Quercus parvula, the Santa Cruz Island oak, is an evergreen red oak found on north-facing Santa Cruz Island slopes and in the California Coast Ranges from Santa Barbara County north to Mendocino County. It was taxonomically combined with Quercus wislizeni until resurrected as a separate species by Kevin Nixon in 1980. The type locality of Q. parvula var. shrevei (originally described by C.H. Muller as Q. shrevei) is Palo Colorado Canyon in Monterey County. It is placed in Quercus section Quercus.

Three varieties of Q. parvula are currently recognized:

 
Q. parvula differs morphologically from its close relative Q. wislizeni in the following ways:
 Leaf blades are larger, > (2)4 cm long rather than < 4(6) cm
 Leaf blades are thinner, generally < 0.26 mm near the apex rather than usually > 0.26 mm
 Current year twigs are 5-sided rather than ± roundish in cross section 
 Leaf petioles and current year twigs are glabrous to sparsely hairy rather than moderately to very hairy
 Nut tips are blunt rather than more sharply pointed
 Abaxial golden glandular uniseriate leaf blade trichomes are missing or sparse rather than moderate to dense
 Abaxial multiradiate leaf blade trichomes are missing or sparse on the midvein rather than occasional to common
 Secondary leaf blade veins are raised abaxially rather than ± not raised
Q. parvula and Q. wislizeni never produce newly emerging leaves with a velvety coating of red bulbous trichomes on the abaxial (upper) surface. This separates them from Q. kelloggii and both varieties of Q. agrifolia which produce such leaves.

Ecology
Mainland Q. parvula is commonly found with or near Sequoia sempervirens (coast redwood), and often near Q. agrifolia var. agrifolia (coast live oak) and Notholithocarpus densiflorus (tanoak).

Q. parvula differs ecologically from Q. wislizeni in the following ways:
 Island or coastal habitat rather than Sierra foothills
 Associates with Sequoia sempervirens rather than Pinus sabiniana

Hybridization 
Quercus parvula is theoretically capable of hybridizing with all of the other California red oaks except the higher elevation southern California Quercus agrifolia var. oxyadenia (sharpacorn oak) from which it is separated by the Transverse Ranges. However Q. parvula's generally later flowering time (April–May versus February–April for Q. kelloggii, Q. wislizeni and Q. agrifolia) may limit genetic exchange with other Lobatae.

References

parvula